Maule may refer to:

Places
 Maule Region, one of the 15 Regions that make up the Chilean territory
 Maule River, river in Central Chile, which gives name to the Maule Region
 Maule, Chile, commune and town of Talca province in the Maule Region of Chile 
 Maule Valley, a sub-region of the Viticultural Region of Chile's Central Valley
 Maule, Yvelines is a commune in the Yvelines department of France
 Condado de Maule is Spanish Count

Other uses
 Maule (surname)
 Maule Air, manufacturer of light single-engine aircraft in Moultrie, Georgia
 Maule's quince, a genus of three species of deciduous spiny shrubs
 Maule Tuco-tuco rodent
 Maule, a sept of the Scottish Clan Ramsay